The following is a list of notable artists that have recorded and officially released renderings of songs originally written by Depeche Mode. The list is organized alphabetically by song and then release year.

"A Photograph of You"
Marsheaux, 2015

"A Question of Lust"
Oliver Cheatham, 1993
Dune, 1998
A-ha, 2009

"A Question of Time"
Clan of Xymox, 2012
Exit Eden, 2017

"Behind the Wheel"
Suspiria (band), 1995
Pain, 2007
The Dillinger Escape Plan with Chino Moreno (Live), 2013

"Black Celebration"
Monster Magnet, 1998
Leæther Strip, 2009
Crematory, 2010
DMK, 2012

"Blasphemous Rumors"
Leæther Strip, 2009

"But Not Tonight"
Scott Weiland, 2001
Pierrot (Tamás Z. Marosi), 2003
Jimmy Somerville, 2004
DMK, 2014

"Clean"
Converge, 2001

"Dream On"
Scala & Kolacny Brothers, 2004
Psy'Aviah, 2011
Hussey-Regan, 2012

"Enjoy the Silence"
Matthew Good Band, 1998
Failure, 1998
Mike Koglin, 1998
Moonlight, 1999, on "Inermis"
Entwine, 1999
No Use For A Name, 2001
Tori Amos, 2001
Caater, 2002
Mike Shinoda, 2004 (remix)
It Dies Today, 2005
Scala & Kolacny Brothers, 2006
Lacuna Coil, 2006
Anberlin, 2006
Susanna and the Magical Orchestra, 2006
Texas Lightning, 2006
Keane, 2007
Moriarty, 2008
HIM
Evergreen Terrace
Apoptygma Berzerk
Breaking Benjamin
Nada Surf, 2010
Antimatter, 2010
Susan Boyle, 2011
Hussey-Regan, 2011
Hybrid, 2012
DMK, 2012
Ki:Theory
Carla Bruni, 2017
Vamps, 2017, on "Calling"
Trevor Something
Lacuna Coil, Instagram 2022

"Everything Counts"
Meat Beat Manifesto, 1998
In Flames, 1997
Unter Null, 2011
DMK, 2011

"Fly on the Windscreen"
God Lives Underwater, 1998
Ane Brun with Vince Clarke, 2012

"Freelove"
Sandra, 2002

"Get the Balance Right!"
 Marsheaux, 2017

"Here Is the House"
Bluvertigo, 1995
Andain
The Echoing Green
Akos Kovacs

"Ice Machine"
S.P.O.C.K, 1991
Lights of Euphoria, 1995
Röyksopp, 2012

"In Your Room"

Zeraphine, 2003
Ayria, 2009
Tori Amos, 2014
Anti-M, 2019

"I Feel You"
Vader, 1996
Apollo Four Forty, 1998
Placebo, 1999
Catupecu Machu, 2000
The Narrow, 2005
Samael, 2005
Collide, 2009
Johnny Marr, 2015

"It's No Good"
Chevelle, 2003
The Dreaming, 2011
 In Flames, 2017

"I Want It All"
I:Scintilla, 2009

"John the Revelator"
Komor Kommando feat. Jean Luc De Meyer of Front 242, 2009

"Judas"
Tricky, 1996
Charlotte Martin, 2010

"Just Can't Get Enough"
Charly Lownoise & Mental Theo, 1997
Erasure, 1997
Nouvelle Vague, 2004
Hog Hoggidy Hog, 2005
Mika, 2008 (performed on tour)
The Saturdays, 2009
DMK, 2013

"Leave In Silence"
Marsheaux, 2015

"Little 15"
God Module, 2004
Between the Buried and Me, 2006

"Master and Servant"
Locust, 1998
Nouvelle Vague, 2009

"Monument"
GusGus, 1998
Marsheaux, 2015

"My Secret Garden"
Elegant Machinery, 1991
Marsheaux, 2015

"Never Let Me Down Again"
Rikk Agnew, 1990
The Smashing Pumpkins, 1994
Farmer Boys, 2001
The Mission, 2002
Berlin, 2005
Tre Lux, 2006

"New Life"
Marsheaux, 2012
Sheer Terror, 2019

"Now This Is Fun"
Marsheaux, 2015

"Nothing To Fear"
Marsheaux, 2015

"Oberkorn"
Marsheaux, 2015

"One Caress"
Leaves' Eyes, 2013

"People Are People"
Atrocity
A Perfect Circle, 2004
RuPaul, 2004
Dope, 2005
Code of Ethics, 2008
Callejon (band), 2017

"Personal Jesus"
Lollipop Lust Kill, 2002
Gravity Kills, 2002
Johnny Cash, 2003
Marilyn Manson, 2004
Jerry Williams, 2004
Nina Hagen, 2010
Placebo
Tori Amos
Shaka Ponk, 2011
Sammy Hagar, 2013
Slapshot (band), 2014
Mindless Self Indulgence, 2015
Def Leppard, 2018
DMK, 2018
Garbage, 2018

"Photographic"
Pouppée Fabrikk, 1991
Freezepop, 2005
Zeromancer, 2009
Theatres des Vampires, 2016

"Policy of Truth"
Terry Hoax, 1992
Dishwalla, 1998
Disown, 2005
Trapt, 2012
Rublood, 2013

"Precious"
Tangerine Dream, 2010

"Rush"
Coil, 1994

"Sacred"
Moonspell, 1997

"Satellite"
Marsheaux, 2015

"See You"
Marsheaux, 2015

"Shake the Disease"
Hooverphonic, 1998
Fokofpolisiekar, 2005
DMK, 2010
The Faceless, 2017

"Shame"
Self, 1998
Battery, 1995

"Shouldn't Have Done That"
Marsheaux, 2015

"Somebody"
Dune, 1997 
Veruca Salt, 1998
Scala & Kolacny Brothers, 2004
The Parlotones, 2005
Peter Jöback, 2009
Damian Wilson, 2016

"Strangelove"
Northern Kings, 2008
Bat for Lashes, 2011
DMK, 2011
Friendly Fires, 2012

"Stripped"
Rammstein (two versions: one ft. KMFDM and one ft. Charlie Clouser)
Scooter
Kent
Novembre, 1996
In Strict Confidence, 1997
Shiny Toy Guns, 2005
Longview (British band)
Psy'aviah, 2009
Duncan Sheik, 2011
Lights of Euphoria

"Sweetest Perfection"
Deftones
 Null Device, 1998

"The Great Outdoors"
Marsheaux, 2017

"The Meaning of Love"
Marsheaux, 2015
DMK, 2017

"The Sun and the Rainfall"
The Merry Thoughts, 1996
Fireside (band), 1997
Marsheaux, 2015

"The Things You Said"
Arsis, 2006
Ben Gibbard of Death Cab for Cutie, 2020

"To Have and to Hold"
Deftones, 1998
The Ruins of Beverast, 2011

"Waiting for the Night"
Rabbit in the Moon, 1998
Lights of Euphoria, 2000
Ghost (Swedish band), 2013

"Walking in My Shoes"
Finger Eleven, 2000
The Dreamside, 2014

"When the Body Speaks"
Hussey-Regan, 2012

"World in My Eyes"
The Cure, 1998
Sonata Arctica, 2004
Akos Kovacs (singer)
Warpaint, 2018

References

 Covers
Depeche Mode
Depeche Mode